Thomas Doherty may refer to: 

 Thomas M. Doherty (1869–1906), American corporal in the Spanish–American War
 Tom Doherty (born 1935), American publisher 
 Tommy Doherty (born 1979), Northern Ireland international footballer
 Thomas Doherty (actor) (born 1995), Scottish actor

See also
Thomas Docherty (disambiguation)